Alan Cripps (born 11 August 1930) is an Australian cricketer. He played two first-class matches for Western Australia in 1952/53.

See also
 List of Western Australia first-class cricketers

References

External links
 

1930 births
Living people
Australian cricketers
Western Australia cricketers